"I Want You to Want Me" is a song by the American rock band Cheap Trick. It is originally from their second album In Color, released in September 1977. It was the first single released from that album, but it did not chart in the United States in its original studio version, which was influenced by music hall styles. 

Nineteen months later, a more rock-oriented live version from the band's successful Cheap Trick at Budokan album was released as a single and became one of their biggest hits, peaking at number seven in the US, number two in Canada, and number one in Japan. It has since become Cheap Trick's signature song.

Background
"I Want You to Want Me" was a number-one single in Japan.  Its success in Japan, as well as the success of its preceding single "Clock Strikes Ten", paved the way for Cheap Trick's concerts at Nippon Budokan in Tokyo in April 1978 that were recorded for the group's most popular album, Cheap Trick at Budokan.  A live version of "I Want You to Want Me" from the album Cheap Trick at Budokan was released in 1979 and became their biggest selling single, reaching No. 7 on the Billboard Hot 100. It was certified gold by the Recording Industry Association of America, representing sales of one million records. In Canada, it reached No. 2 in on the RPM national singles chart, remaining there for two weeks and was certified gold for the sale of 500,000 singles in September 1979. It was also the band's highest charting single in Britain, where it reached No. 29.

Years later, Rick Nielsen and Tom Petersson criticized the lightweight production of "I Want You to Want Me" as it originally appeared on their second album, In Color.  Cheap Trick went as far as to mostly re-record that album in 1997, though this version has not been officially released. Producer Tom Werman explains:

"'I Want You To Want Me' was a fabulous dance hall type of song, and a perfect pop tune, and it was meant to be a little campy. I put the piano on—a guy named Jai Winding played it. I remember asking the band what they thought of it, and Rick Nielsen kind of shrugged and said, 'You're the producer.'"  Further: "It was a burlesque song, like a 30s number. That is what they wrote it as."

Version differences
The live version has a faster tempo than the album version, which contributed to its success. However, the album version features an echo at the verse "Didn't I, didn't I, didn't I see you cryin' (cryin)". This echo does not appear in the live version. The crowd, however, emulates the echo by chanting "cryin'". The studio version features guitar by Jay Graydon. The live version consists of two guitar solos, while the studio version has a piano fill as a second instrumental. 
In early 1977, Cheap Trick recorded a version played in the style they played in concerts. It was played with dramatic vocals, high tempo and two guitar solos. It was later released in 1998 and is almost identical to the "alternate" version, with a slightly different song structure, that was released two years earlier in 1996, from "Sex, America, Cheap Trick". 
In 1997, the band recorded another version as part of a complete remake of In Color with producer Steve Albini. This version generally follows the live arrangement as heard on At Budokan.

33 years after the Budokan version became Cheap Trick's first top ten hit, the band recorded a festive version of the song with the same arrangement, but with slightly modified lyrics, called "I Want You for Christmas", included on A Very Special Christmas: 25 Years Bringing Joy to the World, in 2012.

Critical reception
Cash Box said that it's "a slick piece of pop-rock written by its goofy guitarist, Rick Nielsen" and "though the lyrics are terribly original [sic], it's a pleasant tune, impeccably produced by Tom Weman."

Classic Rock critic Malcolm Dome rated it as Cheap Trick's greatest song, saying that although Nielsen conceived it as "an overblown pop parody" it became "a true pop rock classic."  Classic Rock History critic Michael Quinn also rated it Cheap Trick's best song.

In the 2007 book Shake Some Action: The Ultimate Power Pop Guide, a section on Cheap Trick featured reviews on the top 20 stand-out tracks from the band. One track included was "I Want You to Want Me", where author John M. Borack wrote "the In Color version lacked anything resembling balls, but that was remedied on the hit version from the groundbreaking Cheap Trick at Budokan disc. A piece of history and a darned cool tune, to boot."  Billboard magazine found the live version to be "high energy" with "an infectious melody and raspy guitar work." Record World said it "has a catchy hook over a powerful rock rhythm line."

"Oh Boy" 
The studio version single is backed with the non-album track "Oh Boy (Instrumental)", which was later re-worked with vocals and released on a promotional single.

Chart history

Weekly charts

Year-end charts

All appearances
1977: In Color
1978: From Tokyo to You
1979: Cheap Trick at Budokan (Recorded Apr 28, 1978)
1991: The Greatest Hits
1991: Queens Logic soundtrack
1996: Sex, America, Cheap Trick compilation (Alternate Version)
1997: Private Parts soundtrack
1998: Cheap Trick (1998 Reissue) (Early Version)
1998: Cheap Trick at Budokan: The Complete Concert
1999: That '70s Album (Rockin')
1999: Music for Hangovers
2000: Authorized Greatest Hits

Letters to Cleo version

Letters to Cleo recorded a version in 1999 for the 10 Things I Hate About You soundtrack.  It was released as a single  but failed to chart.

Track listings and formats
 CD single
 "I Want You to Want Me"  – 3:24
 "Cruel to Be Kind"  – 3:01

References

External links
[ Allmusic entry]

1977 songs
1977 singles
1979 singles
2001 singles
Cheap Trick songs
Chris Isaak songs
Dwight Yoakam songs
Jim Witter songs
Lindsay Lohan songs
Dutch Top 40 number-one singles
Songs written by Rick Nielsen
Oricon International Singles Chart number-one singles
Epic Records singles
Reprise Records singles
Hollywood Records singles
Live singles
Song recordings produced by Tom Werman